Since 1937, the United States presidential inauguration has included one or more prayers given by members of the clergy. Since 1933 an associated prayer service either public or private attended by the president-elect has often taken place on the morning of the day. At times a major public or broadcast prayer service takes place after the main ceremony most recently on the next day.

List of clergy at main ceremony
 January 20, 1937 inaugural of Franklin D. Roosevelt
Invocation by Chaplain ZeBarney Thorne Phillips – Episcopalian, Chaplain of the United States Senate
Benediction by Father John A. Ryan – Catholic, professor, Catholic University of America

January 20, 1941 inaugural of Franklin D. Roosevelt
Invocation by Chaplain ZeBarney Phillips
Benediction by Father Michael J. Ready, Catholic, general secretary of the National Catholic Welfare Conference

January 20, 1945 inaugural of Franklin D. Roosevelt
Invocation by Bishop Angus Dun – Episcopalian, Bishop of Washington
Benediction by Monsignor John A. Ryan – Catholic

January 20, 1949 inaugural of Harry S. Truman
Invocation by Rev. Edward Hughes Pruden, Baptist, First Baptist Church, Washington, D.C.
Prayer by Rabbi Samuel Thurman, Jewish, United Hebrew Congregation, St. Louis, Missouri
Benediction by Archbishop Patrick A. O’Boyle, Catholic, Archbishop of Washington

January 20, 1953 inaugural of Dwight D. Eisenhower
Invocation by Archbishop Patrick A. O’Boyle, Catholic, Archbishop of Washington
Prayer by Rabbi Abba Hillel Silver, Jewish
Prayer by President Eisenhower
Benediction by Rev. Henry Knox Sherrill, Episcopalian, Presiding Bishop

January 21, 1957 inaugural of Dwight D. Eisenhower
Invocation by Rev. Edward L. R. Elson – Presbyterian, Chaplain of the United States Senate
Prayer by Archbishop Michael (Konstantinides) – Orthodox, Greek Orthodox Archdiocese of America
Prayer by Rabbi Louis Finkelstein, Jewish
Benediction by Cardinal Edward Mooney – Catholic, Archbishop of Detroit

January 20, 1961 inaugural of John F. Kennedy
Invocation by Cardinal Richard Cushing – Catholic, Archbishop of Boston
Prayer by Archbishop Iakovos (Koukouzis) – Orthodox, Greek Orthodox Archdiocese of America
Prayer by Rev. Dr. John Barclay, pastor of the Central Christian Church of Austin, Texas
Benediction by Rabbi Nelson Glueck – Jewish

January 20, 1965 inaugural of Lyndon B. Johnson
Invocation by Archbishop Robert E. Lucey – Catholic, Archbishop of San Antonio
Prayer by Rabbi Hyman Judah Schachtel – Jewish, Congregation Beth Israel of Houston
Prayer by Rev. Dr. George R. Davis – Disciples of Christ
Benediction by Archbishop Iakovos (Koukouzis) – Orthodox, Greek Orthodox Archdiocese of America

January 20, 1969 inaugural of Richard Nixon
Invocation by Rev. Charles Ewbank Tucker – African Methodist Episcopal Zion, bishop
Prayer by Rabbi Edgar F. Magnin – Jewish, Wilshire Boulevard Temple, Los Angeles
Prayer by Archbishop Iakovos (Koukouzis) – Orthodox, Greek Orthodox Archdiocese of America
Prayer by Rev. Billy Graham – Southern Baptist, text of Billy Graham prayer 1969
Benediction by Archbishop Terence J. Cooke – Catholic, Archbishop of New York

January 20, 1973 inaugural of Richard M. Nixon
Invocation by Rev. E. V. Hill, National Baptist Convention, pastor of the Mount Zion Missionary Baptist Church in Los Angeles
Prayer by Rabbi Seymour Siegel – Jewish, professor, Jewish Theological Seminary
Prayer by Archbishop Iakovos (Koukouzis) – Orthodox, Greek Orthodox Archdiocese of America
Benediction by Archbishop Terence J. Cooke – Catholic, Archbishop of New York

January 20, 1977 inaugural of Jimmy Carter
Invocation by Bishop William Cannon – United Methodist
Benediction by Archbishop John R. Roach – Catholic

January 20, 1981 inaugural of Ronald Reagan
Invocation by Rev. Donn Moomaw – Presbyterian, pastor of Bel Air Presbyterian Church in Los Angeles
Benediction by Rev. Donn Moomaw

January 21, 1985 inaugural of Ronald Reagan
Invocation by Rev. Timothy S. Healy – Catholic, president of Georgetown University
Prayer by Rabbi Alfred Gottschalk – Jewish, president, Hebrew Union College
Prayer by Rev. Donn Moomaw – Presbyterian
Benediction by Rev. Peter Gomes, chaplain, Harvard University

January 20, 1989 inaugural of George H. W. Bush
Invocation by Rev. Billy Graham – Southern Baptist, text of invocation 1989
Benediction by Rev. Billy Graham – Southern Baptist

January 20, 1993 inaugural of Bill Clinton
Invocation by Rev. Billy Graham – Southern Baptist, text of invocation 1993
Benediction by Rev. Billy Graham – Southern Baptist

January 20, 1997 inaugural of Bill Clinton
Invocation by Rev. Billy Graham – Southern Baptist, text of invocation 1997
Benediction by Rev. Gardner C. Taylor – Baptist

January 20, 2001 inaugural of George W. Bush
Invocation by Rev. Franklin Graham – Southern Baptist, text of invocation and benediction 2001
Benediction by Pastor Kirbyjon H. Caldwell – United Methodist

January 20, 2005 inaugural of George W. Bush
Invocation by Rev. Luis León – Episcopalian, rector St. John's Episcopal Church, Lafayette Square (Washington, D.C.)(Text of Invocation)
Benediction by Pastor Kirbyjon Caldwell – Senior Pastor of Windsor Village United Methodist Church in Houston, Texas(Text of Benediction)

January 20, 2009 inaugural of Barack Obama
Invocation by Rev. Dr. Rick Warren – Baptist, Pastor of the Saddleback Church, Lake Forest, California
Benediction by Rev. Dr. Joseph E. Lowery – United Methodist

January 21, 2013 inaugural of Barack Obama

Invocation by Myrlie Evers-Williams, the first woman and non-clergy to deliver an inaugural prayer.
Benediction by Rev. Dr. Luis León, fourteenth rector of St. John's Church. Pastor Louie Giglio had originally been tapped by the inaugural committee but withdrew amid controversy regarding a sermon perceived by some as anti-gay  he had delivered in the 1990s.
January 20, 2017 inauguration of Donald Trump
Invocation by Cardinal Timothy M. Dolan, Archbishop of New York
Invocation by Rev. Dr. Samuel Rodriguez, President, National Hispanic Leadership Conference
Invocation by Pastor Paula White, Senior Pastor, New Destiny Christian Center
Benediction by Rabbi Marvin Hier, Dean, Simon Wiesenthal Center
Benediction by Rev. Franklin Graham, Samaritan's Purse and The Billy Graham Evangelistic Association
Benediction by Bishop Wayne T. Jackson, Great Faith Ministries International
January 20, 2021 inauguration of Joseph R. Biden, Jr.

 Invocation by Rev. Leo J. O'Donovan, S.J., former president of Georgetown University
Benediction by Rev. Silvester S. Beaman, pastor of Bethel African Methodist Episcopal Church, Wilmington, Delaware

Associated morning prayer service
Presidents since 1933 have often worshipped privately before the actual ceremony.
1933 – Franklin Roosevelt attend a service at St. John's Episcopal Church in the morning (Saturday) before being sworn in.
1937 – Franklin Roosevelt attended a service at St. John's Episcopal Church in the morning (Wednesday) before being sworn in.
1941 – Franklin Roosevelt attended a service at St. John's Episcopal Church in the morning (Wednesday) before being sworn in.
1945 – Franklin Roosevelt had a private service in the White House.
1949 – Harry Truman attended a service at St. John's Episcopal Church in the morning (Thursday) before being sworn in.
1953 – Dwight Eisenhower attended a service at National Presbyterian Church in the morning (Tuesday) before being sworn in.
1957 – Dwight Eisenhower attended a service at National Presbyterian Church (Sunday) before being sworn in privately. He was publicly sworn in the next day.
1961 – John F. Kennedy attended the Holy Sacrifice of the Mass at Holy Trinity Church.
1965 – Lyndon Johnson attended a private service at National City Christian Church in the morning (Wednesday) before being sworn in. Billy Graham gave a sermon.
1969 – Richard Nixon had a prayer breakfast in the State Department
1973 – Richard Nixon had no prayer service. He did attend church the next day, a Sunday. There was also a White House Prayer Service with Billy Graham (sermon), Archbishop Joseph Bernardin, and Rabbi Edgar F. Magnin as speakers.
1977 – Jimmy Carter attended a private service at First Baptist Church
1981 – Ronald Reagan attended a private service at St. John's Episcopal Church. Speakers included Billy Graham.
1985 – Ronald Reagan attended a private service a morning prayer service at Washington National Cathedral before taking the presidential oath at the White House on Sunday, January 20. Speakers included Billy Graham. He attended a private service at St. John's Episcopal Church before his public swearing in at the Capitol on Monday, January 21.
1989 - George H. W. Bush attended a private service at St. John's Episcopal Church. 
1993 - Bill Clinton attended a private service at Metropolitan AME Church
1997 - Bill Clinton attended a private service at Metropolitan AME Church
2001 – George W. Bush attended a private service at St. John's Episcopal Church on January 20
2009 – Barack Obama attended a private service at St. John's Episcopal Church
2013 – Barack Obama attended a private service at St. John's Episcopal Church on the morning of Monday, January 21, immediately before his public inaugural ceremony. (He had privately been sworn in the previous day.)
2017 – Donald Trump attended a private service at St. John's Episcopal Church
2021 – Joe Biden attended a private mass of thanksgiving at the Cathedral of St. Matthew. Fr. Kevin F. O'Brien, preached and presided.

Public prayer service

In 1789 George Washington along with Congress attended a service at St. Paul's Chapel in New York City after his swearing in. The ceremony was presided over by Bishop Samuel Provoost. No similar service is known until 1933.

Sunday, March 5, 1933 "National Inaugural Prayer Service" at Washington National Cathedral. Presided over by Episcopal Bishop James Edward Freeman of Washington.

Thursday, January 20, 1977 James Carter had a half-hour interfaith prayer service at the Lincoln Memorial in the morning (8am) before the main ceremony; he did not attend. Speakers included
Martin Luther King Sr., father of Martin Luther King Jr.
Rev. Bruce Edwards, Plains, Georgia
Ruth Carter Stapleton
Leontyne Price and Sherrill Milnes sang

1981 Ronald Reagan had a service at National City Christian Church on Thomas Circle, Washington, D.C., but he did not attend.

Sunday, January 20, 1985 Ronald Reagan had a public service at the Washington National Cathedral. Speakers included
Billy Graham gave a sermon

Sunday, January 22, 1989 George H. W. Bush attended a Presidential Inaugural Prayer Service at the Washington National Cathedral the day after his swearing in.
John T. Walker, Episcopal Bishop of Washington presided
Charles A. Perry, Cathedral Provost, officiated
Sermons were given by
Peter Gomes, Harvard Chaplain
John Ashcroft, governor of Missouri
Edmond Lee Browning, presiding bishop of the Episcopal Church
Other participants included
Rabbi Matthew H. Simon from the B’nai Israel Congregation in Rockville, Maryland, read from the Torah
Vilma Guerrero Smith read reading part of the Forty-seventh Psalm
Rev. Canon Carole Crumley read part of the fifth chapter of Matthew
Cardinal James Hickey, Roman Catholic archbishop of Washington, read from the New Testament
Iakovos, archbishop of the Greek Orthodox Archdiocese of North and South America, read from the New Testament
George Walker Bush read a prayer
Mrs. James A. Baker, III, honorary chairman for the National Day of Prayer and Thanksgiving, read a prayer
Rev. Stephen E. Smallman (Vice-President Quayle’s pastor) from McLean, Virginia, read from the Old Testament

Sunday, January 21, 2001 – George W. Bush had a prayer service at the National Cathedral.
Nathan D. Baxter, dean of the Cathedral
Jane Holmes Dixon, bishop of Washington pro tempore (Episcopalian)
Franklin Graham gave the sermon
Rabbi Samuel Karff from Congregation Beth Israel of Houston read Jeremiah 29:11–13 and gave one of the prayers
Beulah “Bubba” Dailey of Austin Street Center in Dallas, read Proverbs 3:1–8
Archbishop Demetrios of the Greek Orthodox Archdiocese of America led the people responsively in the Twenty-Third Psalm. He also gave one of the prayers.
Mark Craig of Highland Park United Methodist Church in Dallas, read 1 John 4:7–8
Theodore E. McCarrick, Roman Catholic archbishop of Washington, read Matthew 6:25–33 and gave one of the prayers
Kirbyjon Caldwell of Windsor Village United Methodist Church in Houston, read the Prayer for the Nation.
Rev. Peter Grandell, Cathedral staff
Rev. Luis León, rector of St. John’s Church, Lafayette Square, Washington, D.C.
Rev. Suzanne Love Harris, of St. John’s Episcopal Church in Jackson Hole, Wyoming
Dr. Jack Hayford, pastor of the Church on the Way, Van Nuys, California

Friday, January 21, 2005 – George W. Bush had a service at the National Cathedral the day after the inauguration. Speakers included:
John Bryson Chane, Bishop of Washington, Episcopalian
A. Theodore Eastman, Vicar of Washington National Cathedral, Episcopalian
Mark Craig, Dallas, Texas, United Methodist, gave the sermon
Billy Graham, Charlotte, North Carolina, Southern Baptist (prayer)
Rabbi Morton Yolkut, Philadelphia, Pennsylvania
Bishop G. E. Patterson, Memphis, Tennessee, Church of God in Christ
Luis Cortes, Jr., Philadelphia, Pennsylvania, Baptist
The Metropolitan Herman Archbishop of Washington and Metropolitan of all America and Canada Orthodox Church of America, Syosset, New York
Cardinal William Keeler, Baltimore, Maryland, Catholic
Imam Yahya Hendi Muslim Chaplain, Georgetown University, Washington, DC (Did not participate because of illness.)
Cardinal Theodore Edgar McCarrick, Washington, DC, Catholic
Archbishop Demetrios Primate of the Greek Orthodox Church in America Exarch of the Ecumenical Patriarchate, New York, New York
Kirbyjon Caldwell, Houston, Texas, United Methodist
Canon Mary Sulerud, Washington, DC, Episcopalian

Wednesday, January 21, 2009 – Barack Obama had a service at 10am in the National Cathedral. 
Episcopal Rev. Samuel T. Lloyd III, Dean of the Washington National Cathedral – welcome
Episcopal Diocese of Washington Bishop John Bryson Chane – invocation
Rev. Otis Moss Jr., senior pastor emeritus at Olivet Institutional Baptist Church in Cleveland, Ohio – opening prayer
Rev. Sharon E. Watkins, general minister and president of the Christian Church (Disciples of Christ) – sermon
Rev. Andy Stanley, senior pastor, North Point Community Church, Alpharetta, Georgia – prayer for civil leaders
Scripture readings by
Dr. Cynthia Hale, senior pastor, Ray of Hope Christian Church, Atlanta, Georgia
Archbishop Demetrios, Primate of the Greek Orthodox Church in America, New York City
Rev. Francisco González, S.F., auxiliary bishop of the Roman Catholic Diocese of Washington
Rabbi David Saperstein, executive director of the Religious Action Center of Reform Judaism, Washington, D.C.
Responsive prayers by
Dr. Ingrid Mattson, president, Islamic Society of North America, Hartford, Connecticut
Rev. Suzan Johnson Cook, senior pastor, Bronx Christian Fellowship, New York City
Rabbi Jerome Epstein, director, United Synagogue of Conservative Judaism, New York City
Rev. Carol Wade, canon precentor of the Washington National Cathedral
Dr. Uma Mysorekar, president, Hindu Temple Society of North America, New York City
Rev. Jim Wallis, president, Sojourners, Washington, D.C.
Rabbi Haskel Lookstein, Congregation Kehilath Jeshurunm, New York City
Pastor Kirbyjon Caldwell, senior pastor, Windsor Village United Methodist Church, Houston, Texas
Archbishop Donald Wuerl, Roman Catholic Diocese of Washington – a prayer for the nation
Episcopal Presiding Bishop Katharine Jefferts Schori – closing prayer
Rev. Wesley Granberg-Michaelson, general secretary of the Reformed Church in America – Benediction

Tuesday, January 22, 2013 – An interfaith National Prayer Service at 10:30 am in the National Cathedral was attended by President Obama, Vice President Biden and their spouses.
Bishop Mariann Edgar Budde of the Episcopal Diocese of Washington and Rev. Gary Hall, dean of the Washington National Cathedral gave the welcome.
Rev. Dr. Sharon E. Watkins, president and General Minister of the Christian Church (Disciples of Christ) gave the opening acclamation.
Rev. Dr. Barbara Williams-Skinner, co-chair of the National African American Clergy Network gave the prayer for the day.
Rev. Elder Nancy L. Wilson, moderator of the Metropolitan Community Church gave the first reading.
Rabbi Julie Schonfeld, executive vice president of the Rabbinical Assembly led the reading of the psalm.
Cantor Mikhail Manevich of the Washington Hebrew Congregation gave the invitation to prayer.
Rev. Dr. Leith Anderson, president of the National Association of Evangelicals, Kathryn Lohre, president of the National Council of Churches, and Imam Mohamed Magid, president of the Islamic Society of North America together gave the prayer for those who govern.
Cardinal Donald Wuerl of the Roman Catholic Archdiocese of Washington led the second reading.
Abdullah M. Khouj, president and imam of the Islamic Center of Washington, gave a traditional Islamic call to prayer.
Sapreet Kaur, national executive director of the Sikh Coalition, Rev. Charles Jenkins II, senior pastor of Fellowship Missionary Baptist Church in Chicago, and Dr. Stephen F. Schneck, of the Catholic University of America led the prayer for those who serve.
Rev. Gabriel Salguero, president of the National Latino Evangelical Coalition led the third reading.
Allison Mondel, cantor of Washington National Cathedral, gave an invitation to prayer.
Rabbi Sharon Brous of IKAR Jewish Community, Rev. Dr. Serene Jones of Union Theological Seminary (New York), and Archbishop Demetrios of America, primate of the Greek Orthodox Church in America gave the prayers for the people.
Dr. Wintley Phipps of the Dream Academy gave the anthem.
Presiding Bishop Katharine Jefferts Schori of the Episcopal Church gave the prayer for the nation.
Rev. Kirbyjon Caldwell of Windsor Village United Methodist Church led the Lord's Prayer.
Rev. Dr. Raphael Warnock of Ebenezer Baptist Church gave the benediction.
Saturday, January 21, 2017 – An interfaith National Prayer Service in Washington National Cathedral was attended by President Trump, Vice President Pence and their spouses.

 Carlyle Begay of the Navajo offered the invocation.
 Bishop Mariann Edgar Budde of the Episcopal Diocese of Washington gave the welcome.
 Bishop James B. Magness, bishop suffragan for Armed Forces and Federal Ministries of the Episcopal Church led the opening acclamation.
 Dean Randolph Marshall Hollerith of Washington National Cathedral led the opening prayer.
 Mikhail Manevich of Washington Hebrew Congregation gave a Jewish call to prayer.
 Rabbi Fred Raskind of Temple Bet Yam, St. Augustine, Florida, read the first reading.
 Evangelist Alveda King, Director of Civil Rights for the Unborn, Priests for Life; Bishop Harry R. Jackson, Jr., Hope Christian Church, Beltsville, Maryland; and Narayanachar Digalakote, Senior Priest, Sri Siva Vishnu Temple, Lanham, Maryland, led prayers for those who govern.
 Elder D. Todd Christofferson, Quorum of the Twelve Apostles, The Church of Jesus Christ of Latter-Day Saints, led a prayer for civil leaders.
 Imam Mohamed Magid, Executive Imam, ADAMS Center, Sterling, Virginia, gave the Muslim call to prayer.
 Sajid Tarar, Advisor, Medina Masjid, Baltimore, Maryland, read the second reading.
 Pastor Greg Laurie, Senior Pastor, Harvest Christian Fellowship, Riverside & Irvine, California, and Dr. Jack Graham, Pastor, Prestonwood Baptist Church, Plano, Texas, led prayers for those who serve.
 Archbishop Demetrios of America, Primate of the Greek Orthodox Archdiocese of America led a prayer for service to others.
 Canon Rosemarie Logan Duncan of the Washington National Cathedral gave the Christian call to prayer.
 Dr. David Jeremiah, Senior Pastor, Shadow Mountain Community Church, El Cajon, California read the third reading.
 Dr. Ronnie W. Floyd, Senior Pastor, Cross Church, Arkansas, read Psalm 23.
 Dr. David D. Swanson, Senior Pastor, First Presbyterian Church, Orlando, Florida, read the fourth reading.
 Jesse Singh, Chairman, Sikhs of America; Minister Ian McIlraith, Director of Youth Programs, Soka Gakkai International-USA, Santa Monica, California; and Anthony Vance, Director of Public Affairs, United States Baha’i Community, led prayers for the people.
 Cissie Graham Lynch, Samaritan’s Purse, lead a prayer for peace.
 Pastor Ramiro Peña, Senior Pastor, Christ the King Baptist Church, Waco, Texas, led the Lord's Prayer.
 Cardinal Donald Wuerl, archbishop of Washington, Roman Catholic Church, led a prayer for our country.
 Bishop Magness offered the closing prayer.
 Bishop Budde gave the blessing.
 Rev. Darrell Scott, Senior Pastor, New Spirit Revival Center, Cleveland Heights, Ohio, gave the dismissal.
Thursday, January 21, 2021 – Virtual Presidential Inaugural Prayer Service hosted by Washington National Cathedral at 10 a.m.

The Rev. Dr. William J. Barber, II co-chair, Poor People's Campaign, preached. Other participants included:

 The Most Rev. Michael Bruce Curry, Presiding Bishop and Primate, The Episcopal Church
 The Right Rev. Mariann Edgar Budde, Diocesan Bishop, Episcopal Diocese of Washington
 The Very Rev. Randolph Marshall Hollerith, Dean, Washington National Cathedral
 Archbishop Elpidophoros, Primate of the Greek Orthodox Archdiocese of America
 Rabbi Sharon Kleinbaum, Senior Rabbi, Congregation Beit Simchat Torah
 Rabbi Sharon Brous, Senior Rabbi, IKAR
 Jonathan Nez, President, Navajo Nation
 Phefelia Nez, First Lady, Navajo Nation
 The Rev. Jim Wallis, Founder and Ambassador of Sojourners
 Sr. Carol Keehan, Former President and CEO, Catholic Health Association 
 The Rev. Dr. Otis Moss III, Senior Pastor, Trinity United Church of Christ
 Dr. Debbie Almontaser, Senior Advisor, Emgage NY and President, Muslim Community Network
 Imam Azhar Subedar, Imam, IACC
 The Rev. Dr. Alexia Salvatierra, Assistant Professor of Mission and Global Transformation, Fuller Theological Seminary
 Barbara Satin, Faith Work Director, The National LGBTQ Task Force
 Anuttama Dasa, Global Minister of Communications, International Society for Krishna Consciousness (ISKCON)
 Valarie Kaur, Sikh American Activist, Author of “See No Stranger”   
 The Rev. Dr. Gregory Knox Jones, Senior Pastor, Westminster Presbyterian Church
 Bishop Vashti McKenzie, African Methodist Episcopal Church
 The Rev. Dr. Paula Stone Williams, Author and Pastor, Left Hand Church
 The Rev. Fred Davie, Executive Vice President, Union Theological Seminary
 The Rev. Robert W. Fisher, Rector, St. John’s, Lafayette Square
 The Rev. Dr. Yvette Flunder, Presiding Bishop, The Fellowship of Affirming Ministries 
 Emma Petty Addams, Executive Director, Mormon Women for Ethical Government 
 The Rev. Dr. Cynthia L. Hale, Senior Pastor, Ray of Hope Christian Church
 The Rev. Dr. Jeffrey Kuan, President, Claremont School of Theology
 First Lady Robin Jackson, Brookland Baptist Church
 The Rev. Dr. Jacqui Lewis, Senior Minister, Middle Collegiate Church 
 The Revd. Canon Rosemarie Logan Duncan, Canon for Worship, Washington National Cathedral
 The Rev. Robert W. Lee, Pastor, Unifour Church
 Sr. Norma Pimentel, Executive Director, Catholic Charities of the Rio Grande Valley
 Jen Hatmaker, NYT Bestselling Author, Podcast Host, and Speaker

References 

United States presidential inaugurations
United States presidential history